The Sixteen Thirty Fund is a hub of undisclosed political spending ("dark money") on the American Left. The group serves as a fiscal sponsor for other organizations, incubating and financing various progressive projects. According to The New York Times, "The Sixteen Thirty is part of a broader network of progressive nonprofits that donors use to fill specific spaces on the political chessboard." The Sixteen Thirty Fund is administered by Arabella Advisors, a for-profit consulting firm.

Politico has described the Sixteen Thirty Fund as a  "left-leaning, secret-money group", writing that the group "illustrates the extent to which the left embraced the use of 'dark money' to fight for its causes in recent years. After decrying big-money Republican donors over the last decade, as well as the Supreme Court rulings that flooded politics with more cash, Democrats now benefit from hundreds of millions of dollars of undisclosed donations as well." According to Politico, the Sixteen Thirty Fund's activities are "a sign that Democrats and allies have embraced the methods of groups they decried as 'dark money' earlier this decade, when they were under attack from the money machines built by conservatives including the Kochs". Because it is a nonprofit, the Sixteen Thirty Fund is not required to disclose its donors, even though it spends significant amounts on politics. Billionaires George Soros and Pierre Omidyar have disclosed multi-million donations to the group.

The Sixteen Thirty Fund supports Democratic lawmakers and candidates and criticizes Republicans. The group spent money opposing the nomination of Supreme Court Justice Brett Kavanaugh and other Donald Trump judicial nominees and supporting various ballot measures. In 2020, the Sixteen Thirty Fund's $410 million in expenditures focused on helping Democrats defeat Trump and winning back control of the United States Senate.

2018 election cycle

In 2018, the Sixteen Thirty Fund, the New Venture Fund, the Hopewell Fund, and the Windward Fund had combined revenue of $635 million. According to  OpenSecrets, in 2018 the Sixteen Thirty Fund had "thirteen multi-million dollar secret donors." One donor gave $51.7 million to the group in 2018, while another donor gave $26.7 million and a third gave $10 million. The group is not required by law to reveal its donors and it has not disclosed who its funders are. Known donors to the group include Nick Hanauer, the American Federation of Teachers, and the Wyss Foundation. Michael Bloomberg gave $250,000 to a super PAC linked to the Sixteen Thirty Fund. Democratic donor group Democracy Alliance, whose members include billionaire George Soros, has recommended that donors give generously to the Sixteen Thirty Fund.

The Sixteen Thirty Fund was behind several groups that ran issue advocacy ads to benefit Democrats during the 2018 midterms. The group also funded Demand Justice, which spent millions of dollars on ads attacking Brett Kavanaugh's nomination to the U.S. Supreme Court. According to OpenSecrets, the Sixteen Thirty Fund and New Venture Fund "have fiscally sponsored at least 80 of their own groups, bankrolling those entities in a way that leaves almost no paper trail."

The Sixteen Thirty Fund was active in the battle for the House of Representatives in 2018, assisting "Democrats trying to seize back power after Trump's rise." According to Politico, "The election featured dozens of Democratic candidates who decried the influence of money in politics on the campaign trail."

The Sixteen Thirty Fund operates under dozens of different trade names with titles like Arizonans United for Health Care, Floridians for a Fair Shake, Michigan Families for Economic Prosperity, and North Carolinians for a Fair Economy. These groups have collectively spent millions of dollars to pressure Republican members of Congress on their stances on health care and economic issues through advertising and activism.

The Sixteen Thirty Fund spent almost $11 million in the 2018 Colorado elections on ballot measures, lobbying, and Democratic super PACs.

As of 2019, the Sixteen Thirty Fund had spent $141 million on more than 100 left-leaning and Democratic causes, making it a large source of money for nonprofits pushing a variety of changes to state and federal law. In 2019, the fund raised $137 million.

2020 election cycle

The Sixteen Thirty Fund spent $410 million in the 2020 election cycle, which was more than the Democratic National Committee spent. In 2020, the group received mystery donations as large as $50 million and disseminated grants to more than 200 groups. The group's expenditures focused on helping Democrats defeat President Donald Trump and winning back control of the United States Senate. The group financed attack ads against Trump and vulnerable Republican senators and funded various issue advocacy campaigns. Funding went to groups opposing Trump's Supreme Court nominees, supporting liberal ballot measures and policy proposals at the state level, and opposing Republican tax and health care policies. The Sixteen Thirty Fund raised $390 million in 2020, with half of that amount coming from just four donors.

The Sixteen Thirty Fund gave $7 million to a North Carolina group called Piedmont Rising, which ran advertisements attacking Republican U.S. Senator Thom Tillis. According to The New York Times, "Some of the group's ads were designed to look like local news reports from an outlet calling itself the 'North Carolina Examiner.'"

The Atlantic called the Sixteen Thirty Fund "the indisputable heavyweight of Democratic dark money," noting that it was the second-largest super-PAC donor in 2020, donating $61 million of "effectively untraceable money to progressive causes."

In 2020, the Sixteen Thirty Fund gave $10.5 million to the conservative anti-Donald Trump group Defending Democracy Together, which was founded by Bill Kristol in 2018.

See also
 American Bridge 21st Century
 America Votes
 Demand Progress

References

Further reading
 Breyer's Supreme Court vacancy opens the door to even more 'dark money' in 2022 midterm elections

External links
 
 Sixteen Thirty Fund at Ballotpedia
 Sixteen Thirty Fund at Open Secrets
 Sixteen Thirty Fund at Influence Watch
 Sixteen Thirty Fund at ProPublica

Liberalism in the United States
Progressive organizations in the United States
Advocacy groups in the United States